Thomas Scott House is a historic home located near Greensboro, Guilford County, North Carolina. It was built about 1821, and consists of the brick, two-story, single-pile main block and a frame rear ell.  It features a three-part corbeled brick cornice at the roofline.  Also on the property are two contributing frame outbuildings.

It was listed on the National Register of Historic Places in 1984.

References

Houses on the National Register of Historic Places in North Carolina
Houses completed in 1821
Houses in Greensboro, North Carolina
National Register of Historic Places in Guilford County, North Carolina